Pashkaleh, also rendered as Pashgeleh and Pashgaleh, may refer to:
 Pashkaleh-ye Olya, a village in Cheshmeh Kabud Rural District
 Pashkaleh-ye Sofla, a village in Cheshmeh Kabud Rural District
 Pashkaleh-ye Vosta, a village in Cheshmeh Kabud Rural District